Cycas wadei (Wade's pitogo) is a species of cycad endemic to Culion island, Philippines. There is only one subpopulation of about 5,000 mature individuals, located in a small area to the east of Halsey Harbor.

References

wadei
Endemic flora of the Philippines